Esopus is a town in Ulster County, New York, United States. The population was 9,548 at the 2020 census. The town was named after the local indigenous tribe and means "small river" in English. They were one of the Lenape (Delaware) bands, belonging to a people who ranged from western Connecticut through lower New York, western Long Island, and parts of New Jersey and Pennsylvania along the Delaware River.  The town is on the west bank of the Hudson River south of the city of Kingston.  Its center is in Port Ewen.  US Route 9W passes along the eastern side of the town.

History
The town was founded in 1811 from territory taken from Kingston, New York, which also was called "Esopus" at one time. It was officially formed on April 5, 1811. In 1818, a part of it was set off to Kingston, and a portion of Hurley was annexed. On April 12, 1842, a portion of New Paltz was annexed, making up what is mostly present-day Esopus.

The first known European to settle in the area was a trapper by the name of Christoffel "Kit" Davits, who bartered with the Esopus people, a branch of the Lenape. Around 1652 or 1653 many settlers moved south from the Manor of Rensselaerswyck where they had worked the patroon's land.

During the American Revolution, a colonial prison was established there in the fall of 1777 to house overcrowding of a prison ship anchored offshore.  The British army attacked this settlement in the same year and burned it to the ground.

The Cumming-Parker House, Esopus Meadows Lighthouse, Col. Oliver Hazard Payne Estate, Poppletown Farmhouse, and Reformed Protestant Dutch Church of Klyne Esopus Holy Cross Monastery are listed on the National Register of Historic Places. Other noteworthy structures in Esopus include the Mount Academy.

Notable people

In the early 19th century, Esopus was a popular summer residence for wealthy American families such as the Astors, Durkees, Paynes, Rockefellers, Smiths, Tiffanys and Whitneys, who built architecturally significant mansions and hunting lodges on the west bank of the Hudson River, across from the Vanderbilt and Roosevelt estates on the east bank.  

Historical figures and celebrated people who have lived in Esopus include naturalist John Burroughs; financier Harry Payne Bingham; abolitionist Sojourner Truth; 19th-century U.S. politician George W. Pratt; Standard Oil treasurer Colonel Oliver Hazard Payne; business leader and president of Avco Corporation Raymond Rich; the Smith Brothers, who invented the first cough drops in America; Saint Frances Xavier Cabrini (patron saint of immigrants); Major Gen. Daniel Butterfield, who founded the American Express Company and wrote "Taps" in 1862; Eugene R. Durkee, who made a fortune in spices and salad dressings and whose West Park summer mansion became part of the Christian Brothers monastery; John Jacob Astor III; boxing champion Floyd Patterson who attended Wiltwyck School for Boys in West Park; and Alton Brooks Parker, a lawyer and judge who ran for U.S president as the 1904 Democratic party nominee, losing to incumbent Theodore Roosevelt.

In the early part of the 21st century, Esopus became known as a haven for artists and performers, including Academy Award-, Emmy Award- and Tony Award-winning actress Frances McDormand, singer and Broadway actress Kelli O'Hara, actor Sebastian Roché, director Joel Coen, choreographer/director Joe Langworth, actress Blair Ross, Emmy Award-winning actor Peter Dinklage, actress Connie Ray, and reality television personality Luann de Lesseps.

United Nations

In 1946, Esopus was under consideration for the United Nations headquarters. The community was not alone: no fewer than 248 towns in New York State were among the possible locations, along with cities in other parts of the United States and in nearly every European country. On January 9, 1946, a photo appeared in the Kingston Daily Freeman, with a caption reading, "The local UNO Committee mapping a tentative itinerary for the Sub-Committee of the United Nations Organization (UNO) was impressed with the view shown above from Camp Chi-Wan-Do on the River road between Port Ewen and Ulster Park." 

Many local property owners organized to oppose the proposed UN headquarters, however, fearing eminent domain. Ultimately, a donation of more than eight million dollars by John D. Rockefeller, Jr. for 16 acres of land in Manhattan provided the UN with its current headquarters in 1948.

Geography

The eastern town line, marked by the Hudson River, is the border of Dutchess County. The Rondout Creek marks the northern town line, while the Wallkill River defines the western border.

The lowest point in the town is the shore of the Hudson River, which is at sea level. The highest point is the summit of Hussey Hill, at 906 feet (276 m). Hussey Hill is part of the Marlboro Mountains, which run roughly north to south through the central and eastern sections of Esopus.

Esopus also has three lakes: Esopus Lake and Mirror Lake, which are in Ulster Park, and Louisa Pond, which is located to the west of the hamlet of Esopus. Louisa Pond is located in Shaupeneak Ridge Cooperative Recreation Area.

Government
The town's government is made up of a supervisor, four council members, two justices, a highway superintendent, a clerk, and a tax collector. Since 1811, three women have served as supervisor.

Town Supervisor: Danielle Freer (R)
Town Council: Evelyn Clarke (D)
Town Council: Jared Geuss (R)
Town Council: Kathy Quick (D)
Town Council: Laura Robinson (D)

Demographics

2000 census
As of the 2000 census there were 9,331 people, 3,439 households and 2,235 families residing in the town. The population density was 250.5 people per square mile (96.7/km). There were 3,724 housing units at an average density of 100 per square mile (38.6/km. The racial makeup of the town was 94.57% white; 2.18% African American; .24% Native American; .94% Asian; .49% from other races; and 1.59% from two or more races. Hispanic or Latino of any race were 1.91% of the population.

There were 3,439 households, out of which 29.5% had children under the age of 18 living with them; 51.7% were married couples living together; 8.8% had a female householder with no husband present; and 35% were non-families. 27.6% of all households were made up of individuals, and 8.6% had someone living alone who was 65 years of age or older. The average household size was 2.45 and the average family size was 3.01.

The population in town was spread out, with 25.4% under the age of 18; 6.9% from 18 to 24; 29.3% from 25 to 44; 25.9% from 45 to 64; and 12.6% who were 65 years of age or older. The median age was 39 years. For every 100 females, there were 93.7 males. For every 100 females age 18 and over, there were 91.0 males.

The median income for a household in the town was $46,915, and the median income for a family was $55,442. Males had a median income of $38,016 versus $31,010 for females. The per capita income for the town was $21,174.

2010 census
As of the 2010 census, the population was 9,041. The racial makeup was 89.1% white, 5% African American, .4% Native American and 1.4% Asian. Hispanic or Latino people were 5.4% of the population.

2020 census
As of the 2020 census, the population was 9,548. The racial makeup of the town was 84.50% White, 4.58% Black or African American, 0.07% Native American, 1.19% Asian, 2.40% from other races, and 7.26% from two or more races. Hispanic or Latino of any race were 6.32% of the population.

Emergency services 
The town has five fire districts:  Connelly, Esopus, Rifton, St. Remy, and Port Ewen.  Emergency medical services are provided by a volunteer ambulance corps.

Transportation
The main thoroughfare, north-south, is U.S. 9W.

Into the early 1950s, the New York Central was running three trains a day six days a week through the town, with stops, heading north: West Park, Esopus, Ulster Park and Port Ewen, from Weehawken, New Jersey to either Kingston or Albany. Since 1958, this line has been freight only.

Hamlets in Esopus
Connelly – a hamlet in the northeastern part of the town and suburb of Kingston. It is on the south bank of Rondout Creek.
Dashville – a hamlet south of Rifton.
Esopus – a hamlet by the Hudson River and located on Route 9W.
New Salem – a hamlet at the northern town line by Rondout Creek.
Port Ewen – a hamlet in the northeastern part of the town; it is considered a suburb of Kingston.
Rifton – a hamlet in the western part of the town, on Route 213.
St. Remy – a hamlet south of New Salem.
Sleightsburgh – a hamlet at the northeastern corner of the town and suburb of Kingston. The community is at the mouth of Rondout Creek.
Ulster Park – a hamlet north of Esopus hamlet on Route 9W.
Union Center – a hamlet west of Ulster Park.
West Park – a hamlet south of Esopus hamlet on Route 9W.

Notable people
 Sojourner Truth
 John Burroughs
 Harry Payne Bingham
 George W. Pratt
 Colonel Oliver Hazard Payne
 Smith Brothers 
 Saint Frances Xavier Cabrini
 Major Gen. Daniel Butterfield
 John Jacob Astor III
 Floyd Patterson
 Alton Brooks Parker
 Frances McDormand
 Kelli O'Hara
 Sebastian Roche
 James Matthew Jones
 Joel Coen
 Joe Langworth
 Blair Ross 
 Peter Dinklage
 Luann de Lesseps

See also

Esopus Wars
Esopus Spitzenburg

References

External links
Town of Esopus, New York
 Town of Esopus Library

Towns in Ulster County, New York
1811 establishments in New York (state)